Fossiliferous stratigraphic units in Namibia are not as numerous as in neighboring South Africa, but several formations have provided unique fossil assemblages, particularly the Ediacaran fauna of the Vendian to Cambrian Nama Group, fossil fish in the Carboniferous to Permian Ganigobis Formation and Eocene Langental Formation, typical Permian Gondwanan biota in the Huab, Gai-As and Whitehill Formations, Early Triassic therapsids in the Omingonde Formation, Early Jurassic dinosaur trackways in the Etjo Sandstone and Early Miocene mammals and reptiles in the Elisabeth Bay Formation.



List of fossiliferous stratigraphic units

See also 
 Lists of fossiliferous stratigraphic units in Africa
 List of fossiliferous stratigraphic units in Angola
 List of fossiliferous stratigraphic units in Botswana
 List of fossiliferous stratigraphic units in South Africa
 List of fossiliferous stratigraphic units in Zambia
 List of fossiliferous stratigraphic units in Uruguay
 List of fossiliferous stratigraphic units in Antarctica
 Geology of Namibia

References

Bibliography

Further reading 
 

Namibia
 
 
Fossiliferous stratigraphic units
Fossil